Murmelbach may refer to:

 Murmelbach (Hassel), a river of Saxony-Anhalt, Germany
 Murmelbach (Wupper), a river of North Rhine-Westphalia, Germany